The 1980–81 season was the 79th season in which Dundee competed at a Scottish national level, playing in the First Division after being relegated the previous season. Dundee would finish in 2nd place, achieving immediate promotion back to the top tier. Dundee would also compete in both the Scottish League Cup and the Scottish Cup, where they would be eliminated by Falkirk in the 3rd round of the Scottish Cup, and made an impressive run to the final of the League Cup, before being defeated by inter-city rivals Dundee United.

Dundee would switch from Admiral to Umbro as their kit manufacturer, and would return to white shorts along with the famous diamond stripes.

Scottish First Division 

Statistics provided by Dee Archive.

League table

Scottish League Cup 

Statistics provided by Dee Archive.

Scottish Cup 

Statistics provided by Dee Archive.

Player statistics 
Statistics provided by Dee Archive

|}

See also 

 List of Dundee F.C. seasons

References

External links 

 1980-81 Dundee season on Fitbastats

Dundee F.C. seasons
Dundee